Folie à deux ('folly of two', or 'madness [shared] by two'), additionally known as shared psychosis or shared delusional disorder (SDD), is a collection of rare psychiatric syndromes in which symptoms of a delusional belief, and sometimes hallucinations, are transmitted from one individual to another. The same syndrome shared by more than two people may be called folie à trois ('three') or quatre ('four'); and further, folie en famille ('family madness') or even folie à plusieurs ('madness of several').

The disorder, first conceptualized in 19th-century French psychiatry by Charles Lasègue and Jules Falret, and is also known as Lasègue–Falret syndrome.

Recent psychiatric classifications refer to the syndrome as shared psychotic disorder (DSM-4 – 297.3) and induced delusional disorder (ICD-10 – F24), although the research literature largely uses the original name.

This disorder is not in the current, fifth edition of the Diagnostic and Statistical Manual of Mental Disorders (DSM-5), which considers the criteria to be insufficient or inadequate. DSM-5 does not consider Shared Psychotic Disorder (Folie à Deux) as a separate entity; rather, the physician should classify it as "Delusional Disorder" or in the "Other Specified Schizophrenia Spectrum and Other Psychotic Disorder".

Signs and symptoms
This syndrome is most commonly diagnosed when the two or more individuals of concern live in proximity, may be socially or physically isolated, and have little interaction with other people.

Various sub-classifications of folie à deux have been proposed to describe how the delusional belief comes to be held by more than one person: 
Folie imposée Where a dominant person (known as the 'primary', 'inducer', or 'principal') initially forms a delusional belief during a psychotic episode and imposes it on another person or persons (the 'secondary', 'acceptor', or 'associate') with the assumption that the secondary person might not have become deluded if left to his or her own devices. If the parties are admitted to hospital separately, then the delusions in the person with the induced beliefs usually resolve without the need of medication.
Folie simultanée Either the situation where two people considered to independently experience psychosis influence the content of each other's delusions so they become identical or strikingly similar, or one in which two people "morbidly predisposed" to delusional psychosis mutually trigger symptoms in each other.

Folie à deux and its more populous derivatives are psychiatric curiosities. The current Diagnostic and Statistical Manual of Mental Disorders states that a person cannot be diagnosed as being delusional if the belief in question is one "ordinarily accepted by other members of the person's culture or subculture." It is not clear at what point a belief considered to be delusional escapes from the folie à... diagnostic category and becomes legitimate because of the number of people holding it. When a large number of people may come to believe obviously false and potentially distressing things based purely on hearsay, these beliefs are not considered to be clinical delusions by the psychiatric profession, and are instead labelled as mass hysteria.

As with most psychological disorders, the extent and type of delusion varies, but the non-dominant person's delusional symptoms usually resemble those of the inducer. Prior to therapeutic interventions, the inducer typically does not realize that they are causing harm, but instead believe they are helping the second person to become aware of vital or otherwise notable information.

Type of delusions 
Psychology Today magazine defines delusions as "fixed beliefs that do not change, even when a person is presented with conflicting evidence." Types of delusion include:

Bizarre delusions Those which are clearly implausible and not understood by peers within the same culture, even those with psychological disorders; for example, if one thought that all of their organs had been taken out and replaced by someone else's while they were asleep without leaving any scar and without their waking up. It would be impossible to survive such a procedure, and even surgery involving transplantation of multiple organs would leave the person with severe pain, visible scars, etc.
Non-bizarre delusions Common among those with personality disorders and are understood by people within the same culture. For example, unsubstantiated or unverifiable claims of being followed by the FBI in unmarked cars and watched via security cameras would be classified as a non-bizarre delusion; while it would be unlikely for the average person to experience such a predicament, it is possible, and therefore understood by those around them.
Mood-congruent delusions These correspond to a person's emotions within a given timeframe, especially during an episode of mania or depression. For example, someone with this type of delusion may believe with certainty that they will win $1 million at the casino on a specific night, despite lacking any way to see the future or influence the probability of such an event. Similarly, someone in a depressive state may feel certain that their mother will get hit by lightning the next day, again in spite of having no means of predicting or controlling future events.
Mood-neutral delusions These are unaffected by mood, and can be bizarre or non-bizarre; the formal definition provided by Mental Health Daily is "a false belief that isn't directly related to the person's emotional state." An example would be a person who is convinced that somebody has switched bodies with their neighbor, the belief persisting irrespective of changes in emotional status.

Biopsychosocial effects 
As with many psychiatric disorders, shared delusional disorder can negatively impact the psychological and social aspects of a person's wellbeing. Unresolved stress resulting from a delusional disorder will eventually contribute to or increase the risk of other negative health outcomes, such as cardiovascular disease, diabetes, obesity, immunological problems, and others. These health risks increase with the severity of the disease, especially if an affected person does not receive or comply with adequate treatment.

Persons with a delusional disorder have a significantly high risk of developing psychiatric comorbidities such as depression and anxiety. This may be attributable to a genetic pattern shared by 55% of SDD patients.

Shared delusional disorder can have a profoundly negative impact on a person's quality of life. Persons diagnosed with a mental health disorder commonly experience social isolation, which is detrimental to psychological health. This is especially problematic with SDD, as social isolation contributes to the onset of the disorder; in particular, relapse is likely if returning to an isolated living situation, in which shared delusions can be reinstated.

Causes 
While the exact causes of SDD are unknown, the main two contributors are stress and social isolation.

People who are socially isolated together tend to become dependent on those they are with, leading to an inducers influence on those around them. Additionally, people developing shared delusional disorder do not have others reminding them that their delusions are either impossible or unlikely. As a result, treatment for shared delusional disorder includes those affected be removed from the inducer.

Stress is also a factor, as it is a common factor in mental illness developing or worsening. The majority of people that develop shared delusional disorder are genetically predisposed to mental illness, but this predisposition is not enough to develop a mental disorder. However, stress can increase the risk of this disorder. When stressed, an individual's adrenal gland releases the "stress hormone" cortisol into the body, increasing the brain's level of dopamine; this change can be linked to the development of a mental illness, such as a shared delusional disorder.

While there is no exact cause of shared psychosis, there are several factors that are contributors depending on different cultures and communities. Taking into consideration the individual's circumstance which entails their environmental changes and relationships.

Diagnosis
Shared delusional disorder is often difficult to diagnose. Usually, the person with the condition does not seek out treatment, as they do not realize that their delusion is abnormal, as it comes from someone in a dominant position who they trust. Furthermore, since their delusion comes on gradually and grows in strength over time, their doubt is slowly weakened during this time. Shared delusional disorder is diagnosed using the DSM-5, and according to this, the patient must meet three criteria:
 They must have a delusion that develops in the context of a close relationship with an individual with an already established delusion.
 The delusion must be very similar or even identical to the one already established one that the primary case has.
 The delusion cannot be better explained by any other psychological disorder, mood disorder with psychological features, a direct result of physiological effects of substance abuse or any general medical condition.

Related phenomena
Reports have stated that a phenomenon similar to folie à deux was induced by the military incapacitating agent BZ in the late 1960s.

Prevalence 
Shared delusional disorder is most commonly found in women with slightly above-average IQs, who are isolated from their family, and who are in relationships with a dominant person who has delusions. The majority of secondary cases (people who develop the shared delusion) also meet the criteria for dependent personality disorder, which is characterized by a pervasive fear that leads them to need constant reassurance, support, and guidance. Additionally, 55% of secondary cases had a relative with a psychological disorder that included delusions and, as a result, the secondary cases are usually susceptible to mental illness.

Treatment
After a person has been diagnosed, the next step is to determine the proper course of treatment. The first step is to separate the formerly healthy person from the inducer, and see if the delusion goes away or lessens over time. If this is not enough to stop the delusions, there are two possible courses of action: medication or therapy. Therapy can be provided as both personal therapy and/or family therapy.

With treatment, the delusions, and therefore the disease, will eventually lessen so much so, that it will practically disappear in most cases. However, if left untreated, it can become chronic and lead to anxiety, depression, aggressive behavior, and further social isolation. Unfortunately, there are not many statistics about the prognosis of shared delusional disorder, as it is a rare disease, and it is expected that the majority of cases go unreported; however, with treatment, the prognosis is very good.

Medication 
If the separation alone is not working, antipsychotics are often prescribed for a short time to prevent the delusions. Antipsychotics are medications that reduce or relieve symptoms of psychosis such as delusions or hallucinations (seeing or hearing something that is not there). Other uses of antipsychotics include stabilizing moods for people with mood swings and mood disorders ( i.e. in bipolar patients), reducing anxiety in anxiety disorders, and lessening tics in people with Tourettes. Antipsychotics do not cure psychosis, but they do help reduce symptoms; when paired with therapy, the person with the condition has the best chance of recovering. While antipsychotics are powerful, and often effective, they do have side effects, such as inducing involuntary movements. They should only be taken if absolutely required, and under the supervision of a psychiatrist.

Therapy 
The two most common forms of therapy for people with shared delusional disorder are personal and family therapy.

Personal therapy is one-on-one counseling that focuses on building a relationship between the counselor and the patient, and aims to create a positive environment where the patient feels that they can speak freely and truthfully. This is advantageous, as the counselor can usually get more information out of the patient to get a better idea of how to help them. Additionally, if the patient trusts what the counselor says, disproving the delusion will be easier.

Family therapy is a technique in which the entire family comes into therapy together to work on their relationships, and to find ways to eliminate the delusion within the family dynamic. For example, if someone's sister is the inducer, the family will have to get involved to ensure the two stay apart, and to sort out how the family dynamic will work around that. The more support a patient has, the more likely they are to recover, especially since SDD usually occurs due to social isolation.

Notable cases
 In May 2008, in the case of twin sisters Ursula and Sabina Eriksson, Ursula ran into the path of an oncoming articulated lorry, sustaining severe injuries. Sabina then immediately duplicated her twin's actions by stepping into the path of an oncoming car; both sisters survived the incident with severe but non-life-threatening injuries. It was later claimed that Sabina Eriksson was a 'secondary' sufferer of folie à deux, influenced by the presence or perceived presence of her twin sister, Ursula—the 'primary'. Sabina later told an officer at the police station, "We say in Sweden that an accident rarely comes alone. Usually at least one more follows—maybe two." However, upon her release from hospital, Sabina behaved erratically before stabbing a man to death.
 Psychiatrist Reginald Medlicott published an article about the Parker–Hulme murder case, called "Paranoia of the Exalted Type in a Setting of Folie a Deux - A Study of Two Adolescent Homicides," arguing that the intense relationship and shared fantasy world of the two teenaged friends reinforced and exacerbated the mental illness that led to the murder: "each acted on the other as a resonator, increasing the pitch of their narcissism."
 Psychologists H. O'Connell and P.G. Doyle believe folie à plusieurs to have been at least a partial factor in the murder of Bridget Cleary. In 1895, Michael Cleary convinced several friends and relatives that his wife, Bridget Cleary, was a changeling who had been replaced by a fairy. They assisted him in physically abusing her to "cast the fairies" out, before he ultimately burned her to death shortly afterwards.
 Christine and Léa Papin were two French sisters who, as live-in maids, were convicted of murdering their employer's wife and daughter in Le Mans, France on February 2, 1933.
 Born in Yemen in 1963 to Barbados immigrants, June and Jennifer Gibbons were known as "the Silent Twins" for speaking solely to each other in an idioglossia derived from an idiosyncratic, sped-up Bajan Creole dialect that qualified as an example of cryptophasia. The inseparable twins had a longstanding agreement that, if one died, the other must begin to speak and live a normal life, and it was during their 11-year admission to Broadmoor Hospital — where the twins had been indefinitely placed following a series of crimes (e.g. vandalism, petty theft and arson) in 1981 — that they began to believe that it was necessary for one of them to die. Jennifer agreed it should be her, and when the twins were transferred from Broadmoor to the more open Caswell Clinic in Bridgend, Wales in 1993, Jennifer could not be roused upon arrival. She was taken to the hospital where she died soon after of acute myocarditis, or inflammation of the heart. As no drugs or poison were found in her system, her death remains a mystery. Fulfilling their pact, June proceeded to live an otherwise-normal life.
The Burari Deaths, wherein a family of 11 members was found hanging in their home in Delhi, was ruled as a case of "Shared Psychosis," led by the youngest son of the matriarch.
The Tromp family's disappearance and strange journey in 2016 in Australia. The family of five left their home in a hurry to escape "from them"; they threw away their mobile phones. The individual members were found at different places far away from their homes in the following days, some of them in a confused state.

In popular culture
In the "Folie à Deux" episode of The X-Files, Fox Mulder is taken hostage by an employee who believes his boss is turning his coworkers into zombies.
In season 4, episode 3 of Six Feet Under (2004), George mentions Folie à deux to Ruth.
Bug (2006) is a film that depicts a couple with a shared delusion that aphids are living under their skin.
In season 2, episode 3 of Criminal Minds, "The Perfect Storm" (2006), Dr. Reid mentions that the rapists had this condition.
Folie à Deux (2008) is the name of an album by American rock band Fall Out Boy.
The independent film Apart (2011) depicts two lovers affected and diagnosed with induced delusional disorder, trying to uncover a mysterious and tragic past they share. In a 2011 interview, director Aaron Rottinghaus stated the film was based on research from actual case studies.
Nine Perfect Strangers shows a couple who lost one of their two children. The couple and the surviving child have shared hallucinations of the dead child.
Any Porth in a Storm: The Long-Distance Walk that Goes South (2021), a travelogue by Oscar Burton, has a chapter with the title 'Folie à deux', referencing meeting another person dressed identically and with the same equipment who was also walking the 1000 km South West Coast Path in England. It is suggestive of the mental decay of the protagonist which becomes evident later in the story.
The upcoming DC Comics film Joker: Folie à Deux, a sequel to Joker (2019), shares its subtitle with the disorder.

See also

 Anxiety disorder
 Codependency
 Delusion
 Delusional disorder
 Cotard delusion
 Capgras delusion
 Fregoli delusion
 Delusional parasitosis
 Emotional contagion
 Hysterical contagion
 Major depressive disorder
 Mass hysteria
 Mass psychogenic illness
 Paraphrenia
 Schizophrenia
 Slender Man stabbing
 Unipathy

References

Further reading

Books 
 Enoch, D., and H. Ball. 2001. "Folie à deux (et Folie à plusieurs)." In Uncommon psychiatric syndromes (4th ed.). London: Arnold. 
 Halgin, R., and S. Whitbourne. 2002. Abnormal Psychology: Clinical Perspectives on Psychological Disorders. McGraw-Hill. 
 
 Ketchum, James S. 2007. Chemical Warfare: Secrets Almost Forgotten A Personal Story of Medical Testing of Army Volunteers (2nd ed.). Chembook, Inc. ; .

Journal articles

External links
 Shared Delusional Disorder in a Cult

Psychosis
Psychopathological syndromes
Hallucinations
Delusional disorders
Mass psychogenic illness